František Statečný (10 May 1900 – 24 August 1959) was a Czech equestrian. He competed at the 1924 Summer Olympics and the 1928 Summer Olympics.

References

External links
 

1900 births
1959 deaths
Czech male equestrians
Olympic equestrians of Czechoslovakia
Equestrians at the 1924 Summer Olympics
Equestrians at the 1928 Summer Olympics
Place of birth missing